Edward Tyover Anyamkyegh (born 10 Nevember 1978) is a Nigerian former professional footballer who played as a forward.

Anyamkyegh played for FC Sheriff Tiraspol, FC Karpaty Lviv and Kuopion Palloseura in the top divisions of Moldova, Ukraine and Finland in 1999–2005. Anyamkyegh ended his career representing various clubs in the Finnish lower divisions in 2007–2011. He was also a member of the Nigerian squad in the 1995 FIFA U-17 World Championship scoring two goals in the group stage.

The 2004 book How Soccer Explains the World by Franklin Foer includes a chapter following Anyamkyegh's career in Ukraine.

References

External links 

Living people
1978 births
People from Gboko
Nigerian footballers
Association football forwards
FC Sheriff Tiraspol players
FC Karpaty Lviv players
Kuopion Palloseura players
Sepsi-78 players
Atlantis FC players
Nigerian expatriate footballers
Nigerian expatriate sportspeople in Moldova
Expatriate footballers in Moldova
Nigerian expatriate sportspeople in Ukraine
Expatriate footballers in Ukraine
Nigerian expatriate sportspeople in Finland
Expatriate footballers in Finland